The Girl Stage Driver is a 1914 American short silent Western film. It was directed by Webster Cullison and was thought to have been lost, but an incomplete 35mm positive print was found in 2009 in the New Zealand Film Archive. The film was shot in Tucson, Arizona.

Cast
 Norbert A. Myles as The Sheriff
 Edna Payne as The Girl
 Will E. Sheerer as The Girl's Father

See also
 List of rediscovered films

References

External links
 

1914 films
1914 Western (genre) films
1910s rediscovered films
American silent short films
American black-and-white films
Films shot in Tucson, Arizona
Rediscovered American films
Silent American Western (genre) films
1910s American films